Lucian Bernhard (March 15, 1883 – May 29, 1972) was a German graphic designer, type designer, professor, interior designer, and artist during the first half of the twentieth century.

Career

He was influential in helping create the design style known as Plakatstil (Poster Style), which used reductive imagery and flat-color as well as Sachplakat ('object poster') which restricted the image to simply the object being advertised and the brand name. He was also known for his designs for Stiller shoes, Manoli cigarettes, and Priester matches.

Though he studied briefly at the Akademie in Munich, he was largely self-taught.  He moved to Berlin in 1901 where he worked as a poster designer and art director for magazines.  In 1920, he became a professor at the Akademie der Künste until 1923, when he emigrated to New York City.  In 1928, he opened the Contempora Studio with Rockwell Kent, Paul Poiret, Bruno Paul, and Erich Mendelsohn where he worked as a graphic artist and interior designer. In Germany, Bernhard's typefaces were initially favored by the Nazi Party, but were later banned under the mistaken assumption that he was Jewish (largely due to his Jewish-sounding birth name). Later in life, Bernhard worked primarily as a painter and sculptor until his death on May 29, 1972.

Personal life
He was born in Cannstatt, now a district of Stuttgart, Germany, on March 15, 1883, as Emil Kahn, but changed his name to his more commonly known pseudonym in 1905. His first name is often spelled Lucien.

Lucian Bernhard was the father of the photographer Ruth Bernhard.

References 
Rollins, Carl Purlington American Type Designers and Their Work. in Print, V. 4, #1.
Jaspert, W. Pincus, W. Turner Berry and A.F. Johnson. The Encyclopedia of Type Faces. Blandford Press Lts.: 1953, 1983. .
 MacGrew, Mac, "American Metal Typefaces of the Twentieth Century," Oak Knoll Books, New Castle Delaware, 1993, .
Friedl, Ott, and Stein, Typography: an Encyclopedic Survey of Type Design and Techniques Throughout History. Black Dog & Levinthal Publishers: 1998. .

External links
 Long, Christopher ed "Design and reform: The making of the Bauhaus." (Magazine) The Antiques Magazine (2009)
 AIGA Medalist article “Proto-Modernist” by Steven Heller
 Art Directors Club biography and images of work
 Touring exhibition "Lucian Bernhard. Advertising and Design at the Dawn of the 20th Century"
 Plakatstil (International posters)

See also
 List of AIGA medalists

AIGA medalists
German graphic designers
German poster artists
German typographers and type designers
1883 births
1972 deaths
Academy of Fine Arts, Munich alumni